Juliana Klarisa (born 29 July 2002) is an Indonesian weightlifter. She is a weightlifter competing in the 55 kg class since 2019 Junior World Weightlifting Championships in Suva, Fiji.

Medal career
At the 2019 Asian Youth Weightlifting Championships which was held in Pyongyang, North Korea, she participated in 55 kg class. At that time she finished second below the North Korean lifter, Pak Jin-hae and above the South Korean lifter, Lee Ye-rim with a total lift of 175 kg.

After that she participated in the 2019 Southeast Asian Games which was held in the Philippines with total 175 kg.

Not only that, when she started the first international competition in 2020 at the 2020 Asian Junior Weightlifting Championships which was held in Tashkent, Uzbekistan, she finished second below the Vietnamese lifter, Nguyễn Thị Thủy Tiên and above the Uzbek lifter, Nigora Abdullaeva, with total 182 kg.

References

Indonesian female weightlifters
Living people
2002 births
Competitors at the 2019 Southeast Asian Games
Southeast Asian Games medalists in weightlifting
Southeast Asian Games bronze medalists for Indonesia
21st-century Indonesian women